Ajay Rochester (born 1969 in Sydney) is an Australian actress, author and producer. She was the host of the Australian version of reality weight-loss television series The Biggest Loser, for which she hosted a total of four series between 2006 and 2009.

Family and personal life
Rochester was adopted as a child, and states she was emotionally and physically abused by her adoptive mother. She located her birth mother in 1992 after years of searching. Her birth mother died from suicide a year later. Rochester has a son Kai, who was diagnosed with Asperger syndrome at the age of five. Rochester suffered from obesity, which she attributed to the death of her birth mother and her estrangement from her adoptive mother. She resolved to lose weight following the birth of her child, and shed over 50 kilograms since giving birth.

Weight loss work
Recording her weight loss after her son's birth, she filmed the documentary Larger Than Life which aired on The Lifestyle channel. It followed Rochester for a year as she lost weight and took back her life.

Since then, she has been involved in several weight loss projects, including as host of four seasons (2006, 2007, 2008 and 2009) The Biggest Loser on Network Ten.

She founded a website, "The Healthy Body Club", and authored the books Confessions of a Reformed Dieter, Blubberguts and The Lazy Girl's Guide to Losing Weight and Getting Fit.

Rochester also published a children's book called Blubberguts with Hodder Headline's Hotshots series. She has also published two more titles with new Holland including cookbook Food You Love and self-help inspirational book 5-Minute Diet Book.

Rochester joined a weight loss reality show as a celebrity contestant, Excess Baggage which was broadcast in January through March 2012. Rochester won the show and her charity the NOH8 Campaign received a $60,000 donation for her efforts.

After leaving Biggest Loser she gained some weight, and has admitted she used to starve herself to keep her presenting job.

She is Reality Wanted's Hollywood Host for reality shows, covering the biggest reality shows in Hollywood including Survivor and is currently the backstage reporter for So You Think You Can Dance on FOX.

Other television work
Rochester was one of the stars of the MyxTv television series "Cast Me" where four casting producers (including Rochester) cast various roles for wannabe actors.

Rochester appeared on the reality television series Celebrity Dog School with her Pomeranian, "Bootsie".

She was also the co-host of the SBS TV series Mum's The Word.

Rochester and teammate Matthew Palmer won the 2012 reality TV show Excess Baggage on Channel 9 Australia.

She has a recurring role in the Reelz Channel series Beverly Hills Pawn and appeared on America's Court.

In 2019, Rochester participated in the fifth season of the Australian version of I'm a Celebrity...Get Me Out of Here!.

In March 2020, Rochester appeared on First Dates Australia.

Charity work
Rochester is the ambassador for the Eating Disorders Foundation. She has worked with The Make A Wish Foundation and is an advocate for breast cancer research lending her time to multiple breast cancer charities including the Field of Women and BCNA. Rochester is also the face and ambassador for Triathlonpink.com and walked the Great Wall of China to raise funds to build the Olivia Newton-John Wellness Centre.

Short film work
In the late 1990s, Rochester also co-wrote and produced several short films while she was working the comedy circuits in Australia. Her 1998 film BruiZer won the best short at the Scenefest Short Film Festival and was the runner up at the Brisbane Schlock-fest Film festival. She also had a weekly comedy segment on AM Adelaide on Channel 7.

Early acting work

Rochester is a trained actress having graduated from The Australian Academy of Dramatic Arts.

Rochester started her career as an actress in the film To Make a Killing (1988). Her next film was The Crossing (1990), which starred Russell Crowe. She acted under the name Lea-Ann Towler.

She also appeared in the Mini Series Shadow of The Cobra – a story on the life of serial killer Charles Sobraj. She played one of his murder victims.

Published works
Rochester's first book Confessions of a Reformed Dieter was nominated for an Audie award for most inspirational talking book – bestowed annually in the USA for outstanding audiobooks but was beaten by Dr Phil's The Ultimate Weight Solution.  Confessions of Reformed Dieter is now in its eighth print run. In 2005, Rochester's book Lazy Girl's Guide to Losing Weight and Getting Fit was published by Random House and made the Sydney Morning Herald top five best seller list.

Her most recent books are The 5-Minute Diet Book and a recipe book called Food You Love.  Rochester is now living and working in the USA and working on her latest books to be published there and is currently represented by literary agent Jennifer Unter from The Unter Agency in New York. Her next book, which she says will be her final weight loss book is titled Been There Done Fat.

Rochester is also working on a book about her son's autism called Coming to the Rescue.  She has also written a children's book titled Blubberguts.

Bibliography

Contributor

References

External links
Ajay's personal blog

1969 births
Living people
Actresses from Sydney
Writers from Sydney
Australian television producers
Australian women television producers
Australian television presenters
Participants in Australian reality television series
I'm a Celebrity...Get Me Out of Here! (Australian TV series) participants
Australian women television presenters